Lăutarii is a 1972 Soviet romantic drama film directed by Emil Loteanu. The movie was a success, particularly in Italy. The film received the Special Jury Award at the San Sebastián International Film Festival in 1972. The film also received the prestigious Spanish San Fedele prize in 1978.

Plot
Toma Alistar is a gifted lăutar who works as the leader of a traveling gypsy band, wandering the steppes of the mid-nineteenth century Bessarabia. He is a skilled violinist whose fame takes him on tours around European capitals and royal courts. He falls madly in love with the beautiful gypsy Leanca. However, she is marrying a rich Hungarian. Toma spends the rest of life and his fortunes in a desperate search for her. And only before his death he meets an old gypsy woman in whom he recognizes his one true love.

Cast
Sergei Lunchevici as Toma Alistar
Dumitru Hăbășescu as young Toma
Jenea Rolko as Toma as a child
Galina Vodniațkaia as old Leanca
Olga Câmpeanu as young Leanca
Angelica Iașcencu as Leanca as a child

References

External links

1972 films
1972 romantic drama films
Soviet romantic drama films
Russian romantic drama films
Soviet-era Moldovan films
Moldovan drama films
1970s Romanian-language films
Films about violins and violinists
Fictional representations of Romani people
Films directed by Emil Loteanu